John Alec Entwistle (9 October 194427 June 2002) was an English musician who was the bassist for the rock band the Who.  Entwistle's music career spanned over four decades. Nicknamed "The Ox" and "Thunderfingers", he was the band's only member with formal musical training and also provided backing and occasional lead vocals. Entwistle was inducted into the Rock and Roll Hall of Fame as a member of the Who in 1990.

Renowned for his musical abilities, Entwistle's instrumental approach used pentatonic lead lines and a then-unusual treble-rich sound ("full treble, full volume"). He was voted as the greatest bassist ever in a 2011 Rolling Stone readers' poll and, in 2020, the same magazine ranked him number three in its own list of the 50 greatest bassists of all time.

Early life
John Alec Entwistle was born on 9 October 1944 in Chiswick, which is now part of London. He was an only child. His father, Herbert, who died in 2003, played the trumpet and his mother, Maud (née Lee) (29 November 1922 – 4 March 2011), played the piano. His parents' marriage failed soon after he was born, and he was mostly raised by his mother at his grandparents' house in South Acton. Divorce was uncommon in the 1940s, and this contributed to Entwistle becoming reserved and socialising little.

His musical career began aged 7, when he started taking piano lessons. He did not enjoy the experience and after joining Acton County Grammar School aged 11, switched to the trumpet, moving to the French horn when he joined the Middlesex Schools Symphony Orchestra. He met Pete Townshend in the second year of school, and the two formed a trad jazz band, the Confederates. The group only played one gig together, before they decided that rock and roll was a more attractive prospect. Entwistle, in particular, was having difficulty hearing his trumpet with rock bands, and decided to switch to playing guitar, but due to his large fingers, and also his fondness for the low guitar tones of Duane Eddy, he decided to take up the bass guitar instead. He made his own instrument at home, and soon attracted the attention of Roger Daltrey, who had been in the year above Entwistle at Acton County, but had been expelled and was working as an electrician's mate. Daltrey was aware of Entwistle from school, and asked him to join as a bass guitarist for his band, the Detours.

Career

The Who

After joining the Detours, Entwistle played a major role in encouraging Pete Townshend's budding talent on the guitar, and insisting that Townshend be admitted into the band as well. Eventually, Daltrey fired all the members of his band with the exception of Entwistle, Townshend and the drummer Doug Sandom, a semi-pro player who was several years older than the others. Daltrey relinquished the role of guitarist to Townshend in 1963, instead becoming frontman and lead singer. The band considered several changes of name, finally settling on the name the Who while Entwistle was still working as a tax clerk (temporarily performing as the High Numbers for four months in 1964). When the band decided that the blond Daltrey needed to stand out more from the others, Entwistle dyed his naturally light brown hair black, and it remained so until the early 1980s. Around 1963, Entwistle played in a London band called the Initials for a short while; the band broke up when a planned resident engagement in Spain fell through.

Entwistle picked up two nicknames during his career as a musician. He was nicknamed "The Ox" because of his strong constitution and seeming ability to "eat, drink or do more than the rest of them". He was also later nicknamed "Thunderfingers". Bill Wyman, bass guitarist for the Rolling Stones, described him as "the quietest man in private but the loudest man on stage". Entwistle was one of the first to make use of Marshall stacks in an attempt to hear himself over the noise of his band members, who famously leapt and moved about on the stage, with Townshend and Keith Moon smashing their instruments on numerous occasions (Moon even used explosives in his drum kit during one television performance on the Smothers Brothers Comedy Hour). Townshend later remarked that Entwistle started using Marshall amplification to hear himself over Moon's rapid-fire drumming style, and Townshend himself also had to use them just to be heard over Entwistle. They both continued expanding and experimenting with their rigs, until they were both using twin stacks with new experimental prototype 200 watt amps, at a time when most bands used 50–100 watt amplifiers with single cabinets. All of this quickly gained the Who a reputation for being "the loudest band on the planet"; they reached 126 decibels at a 1976 concert in London, listed in the Guinness Book of World Records as the loudest rock concert in history. The band had a strong influence at the time on their contemporaries' choice of equipment, with Cream and the Jimi Hendrix Experience both following suit. Although they pioneered and directly contributed to the development of the "classic" Marshall sound (at this point their equipment was being built or tweaked to their personal specifications), they only used Marshall equipment for a few years. Entwistle eventually switched to using a Sound City rig, with Townshend later following suit. Townshend points out that Jimi Hendrix, their new label mate, was influenced beyond just the band's volume. Both Entwistle and Townshend had begun experimenting with feedback from the amplifiers in the mid-1960s, and Hendrix did not begin destroying his instruments until after he had witnessed the Who's "auto-destructive art".

Entwistle's wry and sometimes dark sense of humour clashed at times with Townshend's more introspective, intellectual work. Although he wrote songs on every Who album except for Quadrophenia, Entwistle was frustrated at Daltrey not allowing him to sing them himself. As he said, "I got a couple [of songs] on per album but my problem was that I wanted to sing the songs and not let Roger sing them." This was a large part of the reason that he became the first member of the band to release a solo album, Smash Your Head Against the Wall (1971) which featured contributions from Keith Moon, Jerry Shirley, Vivian Stanshall, Neil Innes and the Who's roadie, Dave "Cyrano" Langston.

He was the only member of the band to have had formal musical training. In addition to the bass guitar, he contributed backing vocals and performed on the French horn (heard on "Pictures of Lily" and throughout Tommy), trumpet, piano, bugle, and Jew's harp, and on some occasions he sang the lead vocals on his compositions. He layered several horns to create the brass section as heard on songs such as "5:15", among others, while recording the Who's studio albums, and for concerts, arranged a horn section to perform with the band.

While Entwistle was known for being the quietest member of the Who, he in fact often exerted major influences on the rest of the band. For instance, Entwistle was the first member of the band to wear a Union Jack waistcoat. This piece of clothing later became one of Townshend's signature garments.

In 1974, he compiled Odds & Sods, a collection of unreleased Who material. Entwistle designed the cover art for the band's 1975 album, The Who by Numbers, and in a 1996 interview remarked that it had cost £30 to create, while the Quadrophenia cover, designed by Pete Townshend, had cost £16,000.

Entwistle also experimented throughout his career with "Bi-amping", where the high and low ends of the bass are sent through separate signal paths, allowing for more control over the output. At one point his rig became so loaded down with speaker cabinets and processing gear that it was dubbed "Little Manhattan", in reference to the towering, skyscraper-like stacks, racks and blinking lights.

Songwriting
While Townshend emerged as the Who's songwriter-in-chief, Entwistle began making distinctive contributions to the band's catalogue, beginning with "Whiskey Man" and "Boris the Spider" on the A Quick One album in 1966, continuing with "Doctor, Doctor" and "Someone's Coming" (1967); "Silas Stingy", "Heinz Baked Beans" and "Medac" from The Who Sell Out (1967); "Dr. Jekyll & Mr. Hyde" (1968); and "Heaven and Hell", with which the Who opened their live shows between 1968 and 1970. Entwistle wrote "Cousin Kevin" and "Fiddle About" for the Who's 1969 album Tommy because Townshend had specifically requested Entwistle to write 'nasty songs' that he felt uncomfortable with. "My Wife", Entwistle's driving, comedic song about marital strife from 1971's Who's Next, also became a popular stage number. He wrote "Success Story" for The Who by Numbers (1975), for which he also drew the illustration on the album cover; "Had Enough", "905", and "Trick of the Light" for Who Are You (1978); "The Quiet One" and "You" for Face Dances (1981); and "It's Your Turn", "Dangerous" and "One at a Time" for It's Hard (1982), his final album with the Who.

Other work

Solo career
In 1971, Entwistle became the first member to release a solo album, Smash Your Head Against the Wall, which earned him a cult following in the US for fans of his brand of black humour. Other solo studio albums included: Whistle Rymes (1972), Rigor Mortis Sets In (1973), Mad Dog (1975), Too Late the Hero (1981), and The Rock (1996). The band was preoccupied with recording The Who by Numbers during the spring of 1975 and did not do any touring for most of the year, so Entwistle spent the summer performing solo concerts. He also fronted the John Entwistle Band on US club tours during the 1990s, and appeared with Ringo Starr & His All-Starr Band in 1995. A talented visual artist, Entwistle held regular exhibitions of his paintings, with many of them featuring the Who. In 1984, he became the first artist besides Arlen Roth to record an instructional video for Roth's company Hot Licks Video.

Later years
In 1990, Entwistle toured with the Best, a short-lived supergroup which included Keith Emerson, Joe Walsh, Jeff "Skunk" Baxter, and Simon Phillips. Towards the end of his career, he formed the John Entwistle Project with longtime friend, drummer Steve Luongo, and guitarist Mark Hitt, both formerly of Rat Race Choir. This evolved into the John Entwistle Band, with Godfrey Townsend replacing Mark Hitt on guitar and joining harmony vocals. In 1996, the band went on the "Left for Dead" tour with Alan St. Jon joining on keyboards. After Entwistle toured with the Who for Quadrophenia in 1996–97, the John Entwistle Band set off on the "Left for Dead – the Sequel" tour in late 1998, now with Gordon Cotten on keyboards. After this second venture, the band released an album of highlights from the tour, titled Left for Live and a studio album Music from Van-Pires in 2000. The album featured lost demos of Who drummer Keith Moon together with newly recorded parts by the band. In 1995, Entwistle also toured and recorded with Ringo Starr in one of the incarnations of Starr's All-Starr Band. This one also featured Billy Preston, Randy Bachman, and Mark Farner. In this ensemble, he played and sang "Boris the Spider" as his Who showpiece, along with "My Wife". Toward the end of his career he used a Status Graphite Buzzard Bass, which he had designed. From 1999 to early 2002, he played as part of the Who. Entwistle also played at Woodstock '99, along with Mickey Hart, being the only performers there to have taken the stage at the original Woodstock. As a side project, he played the bass guitar in a country rock album project of original songs called the Pioneers, with Mickey Wynne on lead guitar, Ron Magness on rhythm guitar and keyboards, Roy Michaels, Andre Beeka on vocals, and John Delgado playing drums. The album was released on Voiceprint. Shortly before his death, Entwistle had agreed to play some US dates with the band including Nashville's Grand Ole Opry, following his final upcoming tour with the Who.

In 2001, he played in Alan Parsons' Beatles tribute show A Walk Down Abbey Road. The show also featured Ann Wilson of Heart, Todd Rundgren, David Pack of Ambrosia, Godfrey Townsend, Steve Luongo, and John Beck. That year he also played with the Who at the Concert for New York City. He also joined forces again with the John Entwistle Band for an 8-gig tour. This time Chris Clark played keyboards. From January–February 2002, Entwistle played his last concerts with the Who in a handful of dates in England, the last being on 8 February at London's Royal Albert Hall. In late 2002, an expanded 2-CD Left for Live Deluxe was released, highlighting the John Entwistle Band's performances.

Art
Between 1996 and 2002, Entwistle attended dozens of art openings in his honour. He chatted with each collector, personalising their art with a quote and a sketch of "Boris". In early 2002, Entwistle finished what was his last drawing. "Eyes Wide Shut" represented a new style for Entwistle. Featuring Jimi Hendrix, Pete Townshend, Jimmy Page and Eric Clapton, Entwistle's style had evolved from simple line drawings and caricatures to a more lifelike representation of his subjects. He was more confident and relaxed with his art and ready to share that with his collectors.

Entwistle wrote this on one of his pictures:
Now ... ! I'm still the Bass Guitarist. If you're reading this Bio at a show – don't forget to wave – I'm the one on the left. If you're reading this at an Art Show – Help support a starving Artist BUY SOMETHING!

Personal life
In 1967, Entwistle married his childhood sweetheart, Alison Wise. He bought a large semi-detached home in Stanmore, London, filling it with all sorts of extraordinary artifacts, ranging from suits of armour to a tarantula spider. His eccentricity and taste for the bizarre was to remain with him throughout his life, and when he finally moved out of the city in 1978, to Stow-on-the-Wold in Gloucestershire, his 17-bedroom mansion, Quarwood, resembled a museum. It also housed one of the largest guitar collections belonging to any rock musician.

Entwistle and Wise had a son, Christopher. The marriage ended in divorce. Entwistle later married Maxene Harlow. At the time of his death, his long-term partner was 
Lisa Pritchett-Johnson.

Death and legacy
Entwistle died in Room 658 at the Hard Rock Hotel and Casino in Paradise, Nevada, on 27 June 2002, one day before the scheduled first show of the Who's 2002 United States tour. He was 57 years old. Entwistle had gone to bed that night with Alycen Rowse, a local stripper and groupie, who awoke the next morning to find Entwistle cold and unresponsive. The Clark County medical examiner determined that his death was due to a heart attack induced by an undetermined amount of cocaine. Entwistle already had severe heart disease and usually smoked 20 cigarettes a day.

Entwistle had undergone a medical examination for insurance purposes before the Who's 2002 tour started. The exam revealed high blood pressure and high cholesterol. Entwistle's authorised biographer Paul Rees has suggested that a more detailed physical examination would have revealed that three of his arteries were blocked and necessitated surgery.

His funeral was held at St Edward's Church in Stow-on-the-Wold, Gloucestershire, England, on 10 July 2002. His body was cremated and his ashes were buried privately on the grounds of his mansion, Quarwood. A memorial service was held on 24 October at St Martin-in-the-Fields, Trafalgar Square, London. Entwistle's huge collection of guitars and basses was auctioned at Sotheby's in London by his son, Christopher, to meet anticipated taxes on his father's estate.

On Pete Townshend's website, Townshend and Roger Daltrey published a tribute, saying, "The Ox has left the building—we've lost another great friend. Thanks for your support and love. Pete and Roger."

Entwistle's mansion, Quarwood, and some of his personal effects were later sold off to meet the demands of the Inland Revenue; he had worked for the agency from 1962 to 1963 as a tax officer before being demoted to filing clerk, prior to joining the Who.

One aspect of Entwistle's life which emerged after his death came as a surprise even to those closest to him, including the members of the Who. "It wasn't until the day of his funeral that I discovered that he'd spent most of his life as a Freemason", said Pete Townshend.

Welsh-born bass guitarist Pino Palladino, who had previously played on several of Townshend's solo albums, took over for Entwistle onstage when the Who resumed their postponed US tour on 1 July 2002. Pete Townshend and Roger Daltrey spoke at length about their reaction to Entwistle's death. Some of their comments can be found on The Who Live in Boston DVD.

On the opening night of their Vapor Trails tour, which began in Hartford, Connecticut on 28 June 2002 (the night after Entwistle's death), Geddy Lee of Rush dedicated the band's performance of the song "Between Sun and Moon" to Entwistle.

Pearl Jam's album Riot Act, released in late 2002, was dedicated to Entwistle, among others.

Oasis played a version of "My Generation" during their set at T in the Park on Saturday 13 July 2002 as a tribute to Entwistle.

In a Red Hot Chili Peppers gig at Slane Castle in 2003, Flea got on stage wearing a version of the skeleton suit Entwistle wore during The Who 1970 tour, as a tribute.

Technique

Entwistle's playing technique incorporated fingerstyle, plectrum, tapping, and the use of harmonics. He changed his style between songs and even during songs to alter the sound he produced. His fingering technique involved plucking strings very forcefully to produce a trebly, twangy sound. He changed his thumb position from pick-up to the E string and occasionally even positioned his thumb near the pick-up. His plectrum technique involved holding the plectrum between his thumb and forefinger, with the rest of his fingers outstretched for balance.

The Who's studio recordings seldom did justice to Entwistle's playing, in part because he was better heard in concert, where he and Pete Townshend frequently exchanged roles, with Entwistle providing rapid melodic lines and Townshend anchoring the song with rhythmic chord work. At the same time, Townshend noted that Entwistle provided the true rhythmic timekeeping in the band, while Keith Moon, with his flourishes around the kit, was more like a keyboard player. In 1989, Entwistle pointed out that, by modern standards, "the Who haven't got a proper bass player."

Entwistle also developed what he called a "typewriter" approach to playing the bass. It involved positioning his right hand over the strings so all four fingers could be used to tap percussively on the strings, causing them to strike the fretboard with a distinctive twangy sound. This gave him the ability to play three or four strings at once, or to use several fingers on a single string. It allowed him to create passages that were both percussive and melodic. This method should not be confused with tapping or slapping, and in fact predates these techniques. Modern players such as Ryan Martinie of heavy metal band Mudvayne have used similar techniques. Entwistle can be seen using this technique in Mike Gordon's 2002 film, Rising Low. Notable in his left-hand technique was his use of slides, positioning his left hand for octaves, and his use of the pentatonic when playing with the Who.

Entwistle was notorious for the extremely high volume at which he played bass, going so far as to rig pick-ups to each string on his instruments. This led to him developing hearing loss, similar to Townshend. Although not as public about his problems as Townshend, he reputedly had to rely on lip reading to understand speech in his later years. Randy Bachman of Bachman–Turner Overdrive claimed that towards the end of his life, Entwistle mostly played by feeling the rush of air from his giant amp stacks. Entwistle blamed his hearing loss on using headphones.

Influence
Entwistle identified his influences as a combination of his school training on French horn, trumpet, and piano (giving his fingers strength and dexterity). Musicians who influenced him included rock and roll guitarists Duane Eddy and Gene Vincent, and American soul and R&B bass guitarists such as James Jamerson. In turn, Entwistle has been a considerable influence on the playing styles and sounds used by generations of bass guitarists that have followed him, including Tom Hamilton, Geezer Butler, Steve Harris, Matt Freeman, Krist Novoselic, Cliff Burton, Ian Hill, Geddy Lee, Billy Sheehan, Victor Wooten, Tom Petersson, Sam Rivers, John Myung, and Chris Squire.

Entwistle continues to top 'best ever bass player' polls in musicians magazines. In 2000, Guitar magazine named him "Bassist of the Millennium" in a readers' poll. J. D. Considine ranked Entwistle No. 9 on his list of "Top 50 Bass Players". He was named the second best rock bassist on Creem Magazines 1974 Reader Poll Results. In 2011, a Rolling Stone Magazine reader poll selected him as the No. 1 rock bass guitarist of all time.

Equipment

Entwistle collaborated with bass guitar manufacturers such as Alembic, Warwick, and Status GraphiteArchived at Ghostarchive and the Wayback Machine:  His bass solo on the "My Generation" single was a Fender Jazz Bass with stock flatwound strings.

Entwistle's collection of guitars and basses was auctioned at Sotheby's in May 2003.

DiscographyStudio albums'''
 Smash Your Head Against the Wall (1971)
 Whistle Rymes (1972)
 Rigor Mortis Sets In (1973)
 Mad Dog (1975)
 Too Late the Hero (1981)
 The Rock (1996)
 Music from Van-Pires'' (2000)

References

Books

 
 

Articles

 Bernhard Valentinitsch,Bassist im Spotlight.In:Rocks - Magazin für Classical Rock.01/2017.Köln 2017,S.91.

External links

 The Who Concert Guide: John Entwistle Tour Archive
 The John Entwistle Foundation
 John Entwistle's gear reference
 
 
 
 

 
1944 births
2002 deaths
20th-century English composers
20th-century English bass guitarists
20th-century English male singers
20th-century English singers
English rock bass guitarists
Male bass guitarists
English rock musicians
English rock guitarists
Grammy Lifetime Achievement Award winners
English rock singers
English songwriters
English horn players
People educated at Acton County Grammar School
People from Chiswick
The Who members
Cocaine-related deaths in Nevada
British rhythm and blues boom musicians
Musicians from London
Decca Records artists
Polydor Records artists
Atco Records artists
People from Stow-on-the-Wold
English Freemasons
The Best (band) members
Ringo Starr & His All-Starr Band members